The Godala or Gudāla is a Berber tribe in Western Africa that lived along the Atlantic coast  in present-day Mauritania and participated in the Saharan salt trade  and the salt mines of Ijiil. The Godala may be linked to or the same as the ancient Gaetuli tribe of Berbers.

According to a 1985 study of West African history, the  area along both sides of the mouth of the Senegal River was controlled by the Godala group of Berbers. They mined the Awlil salt deposits along the coast just north of the mouth of the Senegal, and controlled a coastal trade route that linked southern Morocco.

Guezula 
The Godala are also known as the Guezula. Today, there are only two small fractions of the Godala left, each with only a few families who bear this name, one in Tiris and the other in Brakna Region.

References

Sources
 General History of Africa: Africa from the twelfth to the sixteenth century edited by D. T. Niane, UNESCO, 1984 - 751 pages, (found on Google books) link
 UNESCO General History of Africa, Vol. IV, Abridged Edition: Africa from the Twelfth to the Sixteenth Century. By Joseph Ki-Zerbo, (found on Google books) University of California Press, May 10, 1998 - 277 pages, p62 link
 WESTERN  AFRICA TO  c1860  A.D. A  PROVISIONAL  HISTORICAL  SCHW  BASED ON  CLIMATE  PERIODS by George E.  Brooks, Indiana  University African  Studies  Program, Indiana  University, Bloomington,  Indiana, August,  1985 

Berber peoples and tribes
Berbers in Mauritania